The Texarkana Open was a golf tournament on the Nike Tour. It ran from 1990 to 1995. It was played at Texarkana Country Club in Texarkana, Arkansas.

Winners

References

Former Korn Ferry Tour events
Golf in Arkansas
Texarkana, Arkansas
Recurring sporting events established in 1990
Recurring sporting events disestablished in 1995
1990 establishments in Arkansas
1995 disestablishments in Arkansas